Don't Push It is a Canadian comedy film, directed by Denis Héroux and released in 1975. The film stars Gilles Latulippe as Conrad Lachance, a clumsy young man who has trouble keeping a job; his girlfriend Gisèle Gagnon (Celine Lomez) gets him a new job as a nursing aide at the hospital where her father Dr. Gagnon (Yves Létourneau) works, exasperating her father because he cannot fire Conrad without damaging his relationship with his daughter, but gradually leading the two men to a position of mutual respect.

The film's supporting cast also included Denis Drouin, Suzanne Langlois, Janine Sutto, Huguette Oligny, Juliette Huot, Fernand Gignac, Michel Noël, Jacques Famery, Jean Guida and Jean-Pierre Masson.

The film was not well-received by critics, with Robert-Claude Bérubé of the film journal Séquences writing that it had no plot progression, no intrigue and no hero. All of the journal's critics rated the film "anémix" (anemic) on the magazine's rating scale of one to four Astérix.

References

External links

1975 films
1975 comedy films
Canadian comedy films
Films directed by Denis Héroux
1970s French-language films
French-language Canadian films
1970s Canadian films